Good Glacier is a wide glacier draining the eastern slopes of the Hughes Range in Antarctica between Mount Brennan and Mount Waterman and flowing northeast to enter the Ross Ice Shelf to the east of Mount Reinhardt. It was discovered by the United States Antarctic Service on Flight C of February 29 – March 1, 1940, and named by the Advisory Committee on Antarctic Names, on the recommendation of Rear Admiral Richard E. Byrd, for Vice Admiral Roscoe F. Good, U.S. Navy, who furnished assistance and support for U.S. Navy Operation Highjump (1946–47).

References

Glaciers of Dufek Coast